LEM may refer to:

 LEM, a musical instrument with the brand name Generalmusic
 Lake Erie Monsters (now the Cleveland Monsters), a professional ice hockey team based in Ohio
 Lamina emergent mechanism, found in pop-up books
 Law of excluded middle, in classical logic
 Lay Eucharistic Minister, in the Catholic, Episcopal or Lutheran Churches
 Learnable Evolution Model, an evolutionary computation method
 LEM domain-containing protein 3, a membrane protein associated with laminopathies
 Leyton Midland Road railway station in the United Kingdom, station code LEM
 Liquid Elastomer Molding, a gasket technology developed by the Federal-Mogul Corporation
 Lunar Excursion Module, the original designation of the Apollo Lunar Module
 Lymphocyte expansion molecule

See also

 
 
 Lem (disambiguation)

da:Lem
de:LEM
it:LEM
pl:Lem
ru:Лем
sl:Lem
sv:Lem